Petrof Bay is a small bay on the west side of Kuiu Island in the Alexander Archipelago in southeastern Alaska, United States.

The bay was named in 1924 for U.S. Census Bureau employee Ivan Petrof, whose reports of his travels in the late 19th century are a valuable source of Alaska history for that period.

Bays of Alaska
Bodies of water of Petersburg Borough, Alaska